Jeanne Lapoirie is a French cinematographer. She began her career in the 1980s, working as camera operator and cinematographer with directors such as Luc Besson and Agnès Varda. She is also known for her collaborations with André Téchiné and François Ozon. She was nominated for a César Award for Best Cinematography for her work in Ozon's 8 femmes in 2003 and Michael Kohlhaas in 2014.

Selected filmography

References

External links

 Jeanne Lapoirie, Afc

Living people
Cinematographers from Paris
French women cinematographers
1963 births